Zomin is an urban-type settlement in Jizzakh Region, Uzbekistan. It is the administrative centre of Zomin District. 14,215 people were residing in the town as of the 1989 census.

The association football club FK Zomin is based in the town.

References

Populated places in Jizzakh Region
Urban-type settlements in Uzbekistan